Passiflora montana is a species of plant in the family Passifloraceae. It is endemic to Ecuador. This Passiflora is related most closely to Passiflora palenquensis, Passiflora deltoifolia, and Passiflora pergrandis.

The Latin specific epithet montana refers to mountains or coming from mountains.

References

montana
Endemic flora of Ecuador
Endangered plants
Taxonomy articles created by Polbot